Md. Imdadul Hoque is a Bangladeshi academic and Vice-Chancellor of Jagannath University. He was a professor of the Botany Department of the University of Dhaka.

Early life 
Hoque completed his master's degree in botany from the University of Dhaka in 1978. He completed his PhD in 1987.

Career 

Hoque was professor of botany at the University of Dhaka. He served as the dean of Biological Science faculty at the University of Dhaka. He saw the foundation of Prof Dr Sheikh Shamimul Alam Trust Fund at the botany department.

From 2017 to 2020, Hoque was a member of the governing body of Akij College of Home Economics. He is an executive member of Bangladesh Association for Plant Tissue Culture & Biotechnology.

In May 2019, Hoque attended a seminar on studying in Sweden organized in association with the Swedish embassy. He is a contributor to the Bangladesh Biosafety And Biosecurity Society. He is the vice-chairman of BEST foundation.

In June 2021, Hoque was appointed the Vice-Chancellor of Jagannath University for a four-year term. He replaced Mijanur Rahman as the Vice-Chancellor of Jagannath University. He oversaw the inauguration of the first female dormitory of the university.

References 

Living people
University of Dhaka alumni
Academic staff of the University of Dhaka
Vice-Chancellors of Jahangirnagar University
Bangladeshi civil servants
Bangladeshi botanists
Year of birth missing (living people)